Juan Daniel Salaberry Brum (born February 7, 1980 in Salto, Uruguay) is a Uruguayan footballer that currently plays for Club Jorge Wilstermann in the Liga de Fútbol Profesional Boliviano.

References

External links

1980 births
Living people
Footballers from Salto, Uruguay
Uruguayan people of Basque descent
Association football midfielders
Uruguayan expatriate footballers
Uruguayan expatriate sportspeople in Bolivia
Uruguayan expatriate sportspeople in Colombia
Uruguayan expatriate sportspeople in Indonesia
Uruguayan footballers
Categoría Primera A players
Expatriate footballers in Bolivia
Expatriate footballers in Colombia
Expatriate footballers in Indonesia
Liga 1 (Indonesia) players
Bolivian Primera División players
Deportivo Cali footballers
C.D. Jorge Wilstermann players
PSMS Medan players
Universitario de Sucre footballers